Kreck is a German language surname. Notable people with the name include:
 Lena Kreck (born 1981), German lawyer and professor
 Matthias Kreck (born 1947), German mathematician who works in the areas of Algebraic Topology and Differential topology

References 

German-language surnames